A number of steamships have carried the name Thielbek, including:

Ship names